2018 Fujieda MYFC season.

Squad
As of 1 February 2018.

J3 League

References

External links
 J.League official site

Fujieda MYFC
Fujieda MYFC seasons